Bhoothnath Returns is a 2014 Indian Hindi-language supernatural comedy film directed by Nitesh Tiwari and produced by Bhushan Kumar. A sequel to 2008 film Bhoothnath, the film revolves around Bhoothnath (Amitabh Bachchan) who is mocked in a Bhoothworld for his inability to scare children  before being sent back to Earth to redeem himself. The film was released on 11 April 2014. 

Election Commission of India demanded tax-free status for Bhoothnath Returns, stating, "The state governments should support the strong social message that emanates from the film. Granting tax-free status to this film would make people aware about their rights as voters like making voter ID cards or not treating polling day as holiday". The Uttar Pradesh Government has declared tax-free status to film on 30 April 2014.

Plot 
The story continues from the previous film.

Kailash Nath, also known as Bhoothnath, enters the Bhoothworld, where he is mocked and questioned about his abilities as a ghost as he was unsuccessful to scare any child. To redeem himself, he returns to India where he tries his best to scare children but is unsuccessful with his attempts as children have become strong physically and mentally and verbally. However, a boy named Akhrot can see him in his true form. Akhrot is not scared of Bhoothnath but helps him scare a few children; in return, he asks Bhoothnath to act scared of him and to run away from a haunted house while he chants mantras in front of the children, so that they can accept him in their cricket team. 

Bhoothnath decides to help Akhrot further by helping him earn money by giving ghosts living in under-construction high rises peace by fulfilling the wishes they were still staying back on Earth as ghosts for; in the process, they come to know why the ghosts died and help their families get insurance money by scaring corrupt insurance officers, further learning in this process about Bhau, a former criminal who is now a corrupt politician. Seeing the amount of corruption in India, and encouraged by Akhrot, Bhoothnath decides to contest the upcoming elections. Soon, the rivalry between Bhoothnath and Bhau heats up, to the extent that Bhoothnath sacrifices his powers to win. One day before the elections, a rally is to be held by Bhoothnath to encourage a high turnout on election day. Bhau's men threaten to kill Akhrot unless he prevents the rally from happening, but Akhrot refuses and is ready to face the consequences. 

On the day of the rally, Bhau's men injure Akhrot grievously for his non-compliance, which causes Bhoothnath to leave his rally for attending to Akhrot in the hospital. He goes to the Bhoothworld and begs for Akhrot's life. They tell him that if Bhoothnath wins the election, they will spare Akhrot's life. Meanwhile, Bhau uses Bhoothnath's absence at the rally to his advantage and tries to influence the audience to vote for him. However, on election day, the majority of the public vote for Bhoothnath. The next day, Bhootnath sees Akhrot's heartbeat rising and realizes that he won the election. The film ends with Akhrot regaining consciousness and everybody celebrating the success of Bhoothnath.

Cast 
Amitabh Bachchan as Kailash Nath a.k.a. Bhoothnath
Shah Rukh Khan as Aditya "Adi" Sharma (Cameo)
Ranbir Kapoor as himself (Cameo)
Boman Irani as Bhau Sahib
Anurag Kashyap as himself (Cameo)
Parth Bhalerao as Akhrot
Usha Jadhav as Bindia Pathak
Sanjay Mishra as Mishti Baihud
Kamlesh Sawant as Police Inspector 
Brijendra Kala as Lallan
Usha Nadkarni as Lolita Singh
Kurush Deboo as Psychiatrist
Gajraj Rao as Bade Sahaab
Subrat Dutta as Engineer Ghost
Vijay Maurya as the ghost of a commoner 
Ajay Jadhav as Constable Shinde

Soundtrack 

The film score was composed by Hitesh Sonik while the songs featured in the film were composed by Ram Sampath, Meet Bros Anjjan and Palash Muchhal. Yo Yo Honey Singh also composed one promotional song for the film which marked his first collaboration with Amitabh Bachchan.

Critical reception 
Taran Adarsh from Bollywood Hungama gave the movie 3.5 stars and said that "Bhoothnath Returns is made with noble intentions and the message it conveys resonates in the second hour". Suprateek Chatterejee from First Post called it "a must watch for kids" and found that its "shamelessly manipulative moments are tempered with deliberate humour". A Filmfare reviewer found that the "strength of this film is in its writing" and praised Amitabh Bachchan for his performance whilst giving the movie 3 stars. Rohit Khilnani of India Today, gave the movie 3.5/5 stars and said, "There is no doubt that Bhoothnath will entertain cine-goers. It's entertainment, Bachchan style!"

Box office 
Bhoothnath returns collected  domestic and   overseas(as of 20 April 2014).

The film that released in over 1,300 theatres saw a "grand" opening of 93% collecting — on its first day with stiff competition from the film Disco Singh. With a growth of 60% over its first day collection, it collected  on its second day. After a good growth on Monday, it saw a slide in its collections over the next few days to end up collecting  in its first week.

References

External links
 
 

T-Series (company) films
2014 films
Indian comedy horror films
2010s Hindi-language films
Films based on The Canterville Ghost
Films directed by Nitesh Tiwari